The 1955 Army Cadets football team represented the United States Military Academy in the 1955 college football season. In their 15th year under head coach Earl Blaik, the Cadets compiled a 6–3 record and outscored all opponents by a combined total of 256 to 72.  In the annual Army–Navy Game, the Cadets defeated the Midshipmen by a 14 to 6 score. The Cadets also lost to Michigan, Syracuse, and Yale. 
 
No Army players were honored on the 1955 College Football All-America Team.

Schedule

Personnel

Game summaries

Navy

References

Army
Army Black Knights football seasons
Army Cadets football